New York's 46th State Assembly district is one of 150 districts of the New York State Assembly. It is currently represented by Republican Alec Brook-Krasny since 2023, defeating Mathylde Frontus. He previously represented the district as a Democrat between 2006 and 2015.

Geography
District 46 is located in Brooklyn. It contains Coney Island and Sea Gate, as well as parts of Bath Beach, Bay Ridge, Brighton Beach, Dyker Heights and Gravesend.

Recent election results

2022

2020

2018

2016

2015 special

2014

2012

2010

Past assemblymembers
 Mathylde Frontus (2018–2022)
 Pamela Harris (2015–2018)
 Alec Brook-Krasny (2006–2015)
 Adele Cohen (1998–2006)
 Jules Polonetsky (1994–1997)
 Howard L. Lasher (1973–1994)
 Leonard Simon (1967–1973)
 Bertram Baker (1948–1964)

References

Politics of Brooklyn
46